Breim Church is a parish church of the Church of Norway in Gloppen Municipality in Vestland county, Norway. It is located in the village of Re on the shore of the lake Breimsvatnet. It is the church for the Breim parish which is part of the Nordfjord prosti (deanery) in the Diocese of Bjørgvin. The white, wooden church was built in a long church style in 1886 by the architect Haakon Thorsen. The church seats about 500 people.

History
The earliest existing historical records of the church date back to the year 1308, but it was not new at that time. The first church here was likely built during the 13th century. In 1334, there was a fire in the church rectory. In 1620, the medieval church was torn down and replaced with a new timber-framed cruciform church. That building was poorly constructed, and it was replaced by a new cruciform church in 1667. In the 1880s, it was decided to tear down the old church so that a new, larger church could be built. It was also decided that the church should be moved a short distance to the southeast so that it would be more centrally located in the village. This new church was completed in 1886, the same year that the Breim parish was separated from Gloppen to become a separate municipality. The new church was consecrated on 9 July 1886 by Bishop Fredrik Waldemar Hvoslef. The old church was torn down in 1887. The new church was a wooden long church with a  nave and a  choir.

Media gallery

See also
List of churches in Bjørgvin

References

Gloppen
Churches in Vestland
Long churches in Norway
Wooden churches in Norway
19th-century Church of Norway church buildings
Churches completed in 1886
13th-century establishments in Norway